The 1958 Italian Grand Prix was a Formula One motor race held at Monza on 7 September 1958. It was race 10 of 11 in the 1958 World Championship of Drivers and race 9 of 10 in the 1958 International Cup for Formula One Manufacturers. Vanwall won the Constructors' Championship with 1 race left to go. After retiring his original car, entered by Scuderia Centro Sud, Carroll Shelby took over Masten Gregory's car, entered by Temple Buell, and finished fourth. No points were awarded for the shared drive.

Classification

Qualifying

Race

Notes
 – Includes 1 point for fastest lap
 – No points awarded for shared drive

Championship standings after the race 

Drivers' Championship standings

Constructors' Championship standings

 Notes: Only the top five positions are included for both sets of standings. Only the best 6 results counted towards each Championship. Numbers without parentheses are Championship points; numbers in parentheses are total points scored.

References

Italian Grand Prix
Italian Grand Prix
1958 in Italian motorsport